The 2012 Hull City Council election took place on 3 May 2012 to elect members of Hull City Council in England. This was held on the same day as other 2012 United Kingdom local elections. One third of the council was up for election and Labour retained control of the council with an increased majority.

Ward results

No elections were held in Bransholme East, Bransholme West and University wards.

Avenue

Beverley

Boothferry

Bricknell

Derringham

Drypool

Holderness

Ings

Kings Park

Longhill

Marfleet

Myton

Newington

Newland

Orchard Park & Greenwood

Pickering

Southcoates East

Southcoates West

St Andrews

Sutton

Results 

Summary of the 3 May 2012 Hull City Council election results

|- align=center
! rowspan=2 colspan=2| Parties
! rowspan=2 | Lastelection:2011
! rowspan=2 | UncontestedSeats
! rowspan=2 | SeatsforElection
! rowspan=2 | Elected
! rowspan=2 | Gains
! rowspan=2 | Losses
! rowspan=2 | Result
! rowspan=2 | Votes
! rowspan=2 | Share
|-
|-
| 
| 34
| 27
| 7
| 12
| 5
| -
| 39
| 22,714
| 53.3%
|-
| 
| 22
| 10
| 12
| 7
| 5
| -
| 17
| 13,566
| 31.9%
|-
| 
| 2
| 1
| 1
| 1
| -
| -
| 2
| 2,693
| 6.3%
|-
| 
| 1
| 1
| 0
| 0
| -
| -
| 1
| 0
| 0%
|-
| 
| 0
| 0
| 0
| 0
| -
| -
| 0
| 2,362
| 5.5%
|-
| 
| 0
| 0
| 0
| 0
| -
| -
| 0
| 733
| 1.7%
|-
| 
| 0
| 0
| 0
| 0
| -
| -
| 0
| 510
| 1.2%
|}

References

2012 English local elections
2012
2010s in Kingston upon Hull